"Formation" is a song recorded by American singer Beyoncé for her sixth studio album Lemonade (2016). It was written by Beyoncé, Mike WiLL Made-It, Swae Lee, and Pluss, and produced by the former two. It served as the album's lead single, surprise-released on February 6, 2016, through Parkwood Entertainment. "Formation" is an R&B song with trap and bounce influences, in which Beyoncé celebrates her culture, identity and success as a black woman from the Southern United States.

The song received widespread acclaim upon release, with particular praise for the lyrical references, as well as for the production and vocal performance. It was critics' top song of 2016, being named the best song of the year by publications including Rolling Stone, Time, NPR, and Complex. In 2019, it was named the best song of the decade (2010s) by publications including Essence and Parade. "Formation" was also Google's most searched song of 2016. "Formation" won all six of its nominations at the MTV Video Music Awards, and was nominated for three Grammy Awards: Record of the Year, Song of the Year and Best Music Video, of which it won the latter award.

The song's music video premiered on the same day as the song itself as an unlisted video on Beyoncé's official YouTube account. Directed by Melina Matsoukas, the New Orleans-set video portrays black pride and resilience through diverse depictions of black Southern culture. The video received critical acclaim, with Rolling Stone naming it the greatest music video of all time in 2021. In order to promote the song, Beyoncé performed it during her guest appearance at the Super Bowl 50 halftime show the day after its premiere.

Upon release, "Formation" ignited discussions on the topics of culture, racism and politics. The song, music video and Super Bowl performance also triggered controversy, with conservative commentators and politicians claiming that Beyoncé was spreading anti-police and anti-American messages and law enforcement groups organizing anti-Beyoncé boycotts and protests. The song became known as a protest song and was adopted as an anthem by the Black Lives Matter movement and the Women's March. The song has also been the subject of study at colleges and universities.

Writing and production 
Co-producer Pluss formulated the original beat for "Formation" in Atlanta, Georgia, implementing a synthesizer effect found in the Virtual Studio Technology plug-in on FL Studio. In April 2014, Mike WiLL Made-It and the members of Rae Sremmund were driving to Coachella and freestyling to beats in the car. For the beat that Pluss made, Swae Lee said: "Okay ladies, now let's get in formation". Will loved the concept and thought it would be suited to Beyoncé, who had recently asked him to send new music ideas. Will believed it could be a huge female empowerment anthem in the same vein as "Single Ladies (Put a Ring on It)", with the song being about women getting in line with the men they are in relationships with. They recorded the line on a voice note and later played it back when in a recording studio in Los Angeles. Lee recorded a simple reference track, freestyling over the beat. Mike Will sent it to Beyoncé, together with five or six other reference tracks. A few months later, Mike Will was at a party after a basketball game. Beyoncé appeared at the party and told him she really liked the "Formation" idea, and left it at that.

Beyoncé then wrote all of the verses of the song in New York, while keeping the central concept of "okay ladies, now let's get in formation". Beyoncé's verses took the song in a different direction from what Will intended and broadened its scope to turn it into an anthem about her identity, heritage and culture. Jon Platt of Warner Chappell Music told Mike Will: "Yo, this shit's crazy, you got to hear this". Will went to New York and spent a week in the studio with Beyoncé to complete the recording and production. They added heavy, distorted 808 beats with saturated upper harmonics to the track to make it "palatable to the culture", according to mixing engineer Jaycen Joshua. Beyoncé thought it could be a song that marching bands would play, and asked for horns to be added to the track to evoke the sounds of New Orleans. Will explained that Beyoncé "took this one little idea we came up with on the way to Coachella, put it in a pot, stirred it up, and came with this smash. She takes ideas and puts them with her own ideas, and makes this masterpiece."

Release
"Formation" was released on February 6, 2016, accompanied by its official music video. It was a surprise release, being released with no prior announcement in a similar manner to Beyoncé's 2013 self-titled studio album. The song was made available for free download exclusively via the subscription-based music streaming service Tidal. The release of the song was also followed by new merchandise through the singer's website with items and clothing citing lyrics from the song. The release date of the song was noteworthy as it was the start of Black History Month, during Mardi Gras in New Orleans, the day after Trayvon Martin's birthday, and the day before Sandra Bland's birthday.

Composition and lyrical interpretation
"Formation" is a Houston trap and New Orleans bounce song. The song is written in the key of F minor in common time with a tempo of 123 beats per minute. It has a minimalistic beat containing rubbery synths and a heavy bass line, which transforms into a horn-infused stomp reminiscent of marching bands and military tattoos. Regina N. Bradley for The Huffington Post wrote that the synth effect sounds like a tweaked electronic banjo from the bayou, which positions Beyoncé "squarely in the middle of a messy Black South". In The Oxford Handbook of Social Media and Music Learning, Joseph Michael Abramo wrote that Beyoncé's implementation of electronic production, brass elements and vocal fry in "Formation" acts as a tribute to the signifiers of black music, while also forming a critique of institutional racism together with the lyrics. The song has an unconventional structure that deviates from the norm of pop music. American singer-songwriter Mike Errico called the songwriting "practically Dylanesque", with no single clear chorus on the track, but instead a chorus followed by a "super-chorus" that "blows what we thought was the chorus out of the water".

Beyoncé's vocals span from D3 to A4 in the song. Beyoncé employs multiple delivery styles on the track, with the introduction being delivered in a hoarse, whispered tone that switches into a half-rapped, half-sung cadence as the song progresses. Lauren Chanel Allen of Teen Vogue noted how Beyoncé used "a lazy trap flow" instead of "her superhuman vocal range", which acts as a refusal to code-switch and an embracing of blackness. The Guardian Alex Macpherson characterized Beyoncé's delivery as "playful" and "carefree", noting the "amused drawl" of the opening line and the "sudden giddy exclamation as she lands on the word "chaser" in the chorus". Sheldon Pearce of Pitchfork described how Beyoncé raps on the track, implementing enunciated syllables, "hard-cracking consonant sounds and precisely-measured alliteration" that make the lyrics satisfying to recite.

"Formation" contains strong political criticism in its lyrics, being described by Los Angeles Times Mikael Wood as "a statement of radical black positivity." It also was noted by Joseph Lamour who commented during a review for MTV that "Formation" is "a song whose lyrics are teeming with notions of empowerment and pride in her heritage as a black American with roots in Alabama and Louisiana." In the opening line, Beyoncé says "Y'all haters corny with that Illuminati mess", addressing the conspiracy theory about the singer's connection to the Illuminati. With this line, Beyoncé is dismissing those who believe that black women can only achieve success through secretive manipulation instead of recognizing their talent and hard work. NPR's Mandalit del Barco noted during the first verse, Beyoncé represents her family roots, she said, "Her mother is from Louisiana, as she let us know in the song. This has always been a big part of her identity; it's not one that the mainstream focus is on. People talk about her not centering it." She also described the lines as an "unapologetic blackness".

Critical response

Reviews 
"Formation" received widespread critical acclaim upon release. Alexis Petridis, head rock and pop critic for The Guardian, characterized "Formation" as "a masterpiece", citing the "adventurous" music, Beyoncé's "perfect" vocal performance which switches "between playfulness and determination", and the lyrics that act as "a powerful statement of black resilience and a tribute to the fabulousness of Beyoncé". Pitchfork named the song "Best New Track", with Britt Julious describing it as one of Beyoncé's "most instrumentally-dense and trend-forward productions" which is made specifically for black women, "an audience that might not receive the sort of mainstream, visually and sonically-enticing wisdom that Bey has perfected". Julious added that "for Beyoncé (and for her listeners, too), the unapologetic embracing of one's blackness and the power one can harness when making a name, livelihood, and legacy can't ever be ignored or taken for granted." The New York Times Jenna Wortham praised the expression of black identity in the song, writing that is "about the entirety of the black experience in America in 2016" encompassing topics such as beauty standards, police brutality, empowerment, and shared culture and history. Wortham also characterized the song as "an existential call to action", with Beyoncé telling black women to join her in formation, making "a power structure that doesn't rely on traditional institutions."

In The Lemonade Reader, Tamara Winfrey Harris described the song as "a radical act", with Beyoncé forgoing an image of blackness that appeases white Americans ("smiling, agreeable, passive, straight, and as close to white as possible") in favor of one that makes them uncomfortable ("Nappy Black, 'Bama Black, queer Black, sexual Black, militant Black"). Omise'eke Natasha Tinsley, a professor of African Studies at University of Texas at Austin, writes for Time that the song, which many called "political" because of its references, "differs radically from other post-Ferguson protests songs like Trip Lee's "Coulda Been Me" or Rihanna's "American Oxygen" video, which focuses on black men's deaths", calling African American women to stand side by side ("in formation"). Kevin Fallon of The Daily Beast called the song "a booming meditation on black identity, the validity and transience of a person's roots and history, and the crushing interplay between power and helplessness, agency, and victimization". A Rolling Stone journalist wrote that "in the era of #BlackLivesMatter, 'Formation' felt downright necessary" and further deemed it "a powerful statement of black Southern resilience". "Formation" was later placed at number one on the same magazine's "50 Best Songs of 2016" list by Rob Sheffield, with him commenting: Formation' was a song that kept hope alive in a bleak year – and it will be essential ammo for the struggles to come in the next."

Recognition 
According to global critic aggregator Acclaimed Music, "Formation" was critics' top song of 2016. It was named the best song of 2016 by Rolling Stone, Time, NPR, Rolling Stone Australia, Rolling Stone Argentina, Complex, Entertainment Weekly, Fuse, Paste, The Music, Musikexpress, Aftonbladet, Idolator, Mashable, Red Bull, and PopMatters. In the annual Village Voice's Pazz & Jop mass critics poll of the year's best in music in 2016, "Formation" was ranked at number one. The song was also named the best international song of 2016 by Rolling Stone Brazil. Pitchfork and Spin named the song the second best of the year, while Noisey named it the fourth best. Fact named it the fifth best song of the year, while NME the sixth. Billboard ranked "Formation" at number one on their "10 Best R&B Songs of 2016" list, and number 14 on their "100 Best Pop Songs of 2016" list. "Formation" was also named one of the best songs of 2016 by The Irish Times, Elle, and Harper's Bazaar.

In 2019, Essence and Parade named "Formation" the greatest song of the decade (2010s). Consequence of Sound, Paste, Insider, and Tampa Bay Times listed "Formation" as the third greatest song of the 2010s. For Pitchfork and Rolling Stone it was the fourth best of the same period, while for Stereogum it was the 8th best, and for NME, the 11th best. BBC, Billboard, and GQ included "Formation" in their lists of the songs that defined and shaped the decade. From over 35 outlets, global critic aggregator Acclaimed Music went on to rank "Formation" the 3rd greatest song of the 2010s. Vulture included the release date of "Formation" in their list of the 103 days that shaped music in the 2010s.

The Independent included "Formation" on their list of the 40 best song lyrics of all time. i-D ranked the song at number one on their list of the greatest pop comebacks of the 21st century. In 2021, Rolling Stone placed the song at number 73 on its list of the 500 Greatest Songs of All Time.

Accolades
"Formation" received three nominations at the 59th Annual Grammy Awards: Record of the Year, Song of the Year and Best Music Video, of which it won the latter award. At the 2016 MTV Video Music Awards, "Formation" won all of its nominations, making Beyoncé the most awarded artist in Video Music Awards history. This video's win for Video of the Year marked Beyoncé's second win in this category, tying the record for artist with the most wins in the category in history. With the song's win for Best Pop Video, Beyoncé became the only black artist to win the award in history.

Chart performance 
Prior to its official release as a single, "Formation" debuted at number nine on the US Billboard Bubbling Under Hot 100 in February 2016. The song also debuted at number 11 on the US Hot R&B/Hip-Hop Airplay with 16.3 million audience impressions, marking Beyoncé's highest career debut on that chart, despite the song not being promoted to radio stations or available for purchase. Throughout March, the song reached number 33 on the Hot R&B/Hip-Hop Songs due to airplay and further purchase was not disclosed to Billboard by Tidal, the official platform where the song was exclusively made available. After the release of Lemonade, "Formation" set new peak positions on the charts. It debuted at number 10 on the Billboard Hot 100 chart on May 2, 2016, becoming Beyoncé's first top 10 single since "Drunk in Love" in 2014; it is also the singer's highest-debuting single of her career (surpassing "Ring the Alarm" and "Drunk in Love" which both debuted at number 12). During that week, the song debuted at number three on the Digital Songs chart, selling 174,000 downloads. It fell to number 19 on the Hot 100 in its second week.

Upon the release of Lemonade, "Formation" also debuted on several international charts. It debuted at number 31 on the UK Singles Chart on May 5, 2016. The same week it also moved to a new peak position of eight on the UK R&B Singles chart. On the ARIA Singles Chart, the song set a peak of 17 on the chart issue dated May 8, 2016. It managed to top the ARIA Urban chart the same week, while the singer's own "Hold Up" was on the second spot. On the French Singles Chart, "Formation" set a peak position of 24 during the week of the album's release. In Canada, the single peaked at number 32 on the Canadian Hot 100 and was certified gold by Music Canada on November 28, 2019, for sales of 80,000 units.

Music video

Development and release
Beyoncé approached Melina Matsoukas to direct the accompanying music video for "Formation" a few weeks before its release. After Matsoukas agreed to direct the video, Beyoncé invited Matsoukas to her house in Los Angeles and explained the concept behind Lemonade. They also discussed Beyoncé's family history, the South, and New Orleans. Matsoukas explained how she treats the videos she directs "like a thesis project", spending hours browsing art books, magazines, and websites. For the "Formation" video, she found ideas in the work of Toni Morrison, Maya Angelou, and Octavia Butler. Matsoukas conceived scenes featuring events from throughout black history, including slavery, Mardi Gras parades and the Rodney King protests. Matsoukas told The New Yorker: "I wanted to show — this is black people. We triumph, we suffer, we're drowning, we're being beaten, we're dancing, we're eating, and we're still here". She wrote out a treatment at 2am and sent it to Beyoncé at 5am or 6am, thinking that Beyoncé would reply later in the day. However, Beyoncé responded immediately and asked to discuss it further.

One set for the video was the Fenyes Estate, which was used due to its resemblance to New Orleans plantation houses. To evoke a Southern Gothic aesthetic, production designer Ethan Tobman and his crew decorated rooms with vintage plantation-era rugs and furniture, while adding storm shutters, Spanish moss, ivy, and wisteria to the building's exterior. Matsoukas wanted to include French Renaissance-style portraits of black subjects in the house, with the aim of subverting traditional power dynamics by portraying a plantation house where the black people are the masters and not the slaves. The crew looked for such portraits but found that none existed, so they painted black people over other portraits and hung them on the walls.

The music video for "Formation" was shot in Los Angeles, California over two days. Arthur Jafa was hired as camera operator; Jafa had been the cinematographer of Daughters of the Dust, a 1991 film about Gullah women in South Carolina whose focus on black sisterhood is echoed throughout the "Formation" video. Matsoukas wanted to create a sense of verisimilitude in the video, shooting some scenes with a camcorder and others with a Bolex camera, the latter giving the scenes a grainy look resembling documentary footage. Matsoukas also used footage from That B.E.A.T., a 2014 documentary about bounce culture in New Orleans. The filmmakers of the documentary were alternately pleased with its inclusion and frustrated by their work being used as "just b-roll by someone else". A representative for Beyoncé told Entertainment Weekly that the documentary footage was used with permission and licensed from the owner of the footage, and that they were correctly compensated and credited.

Matsoukas devised a scene of Beyoncé performing on top of a police car that slowly sinks into the floodwaters of Hurricane Katrina. This scene represented how the police "hadn't really shown up for us, and that we were still here on top, and that she was one with the people who had suffered". The scene was filmed on a soundstage with an artificial lake backed by a blue screen, with oak trees, rooftops and cast iron gates added to the lake to provide realism. A series of pulleys and cables connected to a winch and a crane allowed Beyoncé and the police car to be repeatedly sunk into the water with controlled speed. The scene was filmed using one camera suspended by a crane on a barge and another camera that Matsoukas operated from a speedboat. Beyoncé's mother Tina Knowles-Lawson was scared because the water was cold and called Matsoukas saying "You're going to give her pneumonia, and she has to perform at the Super Bowl", however Beyoncé did not complain. Instead of ending the video with Beyoncé sinking into the water, Matsoukas wanted to use a more uplifting image. Looking through the footage, she found a shot of Beyoncé sitting in the plantation house making the "black-girl air grab". She placed this clip at the end of the video as an emphatic last gesture.

The "Formation" video was premiered alongside the song on February 6, 2016. It was made available as an unlisted video on YouTube; this prevented the music video from being accessed by search functionalities, with viewers needing to access the video via Beyoncé's official website.

Synopsis and analysis 
The music video is set in New Orleans, exploring interpretations of the city's past, present and future in the wake of Hurricane Katrina, in turn forming a celebration of black pride and resilience. It features rapidly edited scenes that depict the variety and heterogeneity of black Southern culture. This includes Mardi Gras, black cowboys, stepping, wig shops, crawfish, cotillions, grills, black preachers, second lines, marching bands, bounce dancers, and traditional courtship and burial rituals. Beyoncé is seen embodying several archetypal Southern black women that span time, class, and space, which Ryann Donnelly viewed as being nine distinct personas that recur throughout the video. The video modifies the song to include spoken interpolations from the New Orleans artist Big Freedia and the YouTube personality Messy Mya, who was murdered in New Orleans in 2010. Dance routines are performed throughout the video by Beyoncé accompanied by back-up dancers. Her daughter Blue Ivy Carter makes a cameo appearance, sporting a natural afro.

The video begins with Beyoncé crouching on top of a New Orleans police interceptor, which is partially submerged in floodwaters. As the video progresses, the car gradually sinks into the water. The scene forms a criticism of the police response to Hurricane Katrina, which disproportionately affected people of color, while also acting as a symbol of rebirth. An additional interpretation of this scene is that Beyoncé is invoking Mami Wata, harnessing water as a force of life and destruction. Jennifer Sweeney-Risko believes Beyoncé's outfit in this scene to be a reference to the Student Non-Violent Coordinating Committee, who traveled through the South to plan freedom rides, sit-ins and voter registration drives while wearing jeans and simple dresses to replicate the clothes of the black working class. Another set of scenes portray Beyoncé as the mistress of an all-black household in a Southern plantation-style house, reclaiming the legacy of slavery in the South. Beyoncé and her dancers perform in an empty swimming pool in another scene, referencing the story of a recently-desegregated public swimming pool in the 1950s being drained after Dorothy Dandridge dipped her toe in it.Beyoncé is later depicted standing in front of a plantation house with a black wide-brimmed hat covering her eyes, which Janell Hobson interprets as an invocation of the Vodou death loa Maman Brigitte. In another scene, a man can be seen holding a newspaper titled The Truth with an image of Martin Luther King Jr. on the front page. Headlined "More Than A Dreamer", the image contains the caption: "What is the real legacy of Dr. Martin Luther King, Jr. and why was a revolutionary recast as an acceptable Negro leader?" Laura Visser-Maessen wrote that with this scene, Beyoncé is bringing awareness to the whitewashing of King's legacy as a non-radical figure, which is being used to undermine the current movement for racial equality. The last sequence depicts a young boy in a hoodie dancing in front of a line of police officers in riot gear. When the boy holds up his hands, the officers reciprocate the gesture. The video cuts to a wall graffitied with the phrase: "Stop shooting us", echoing the demand of the Black Lives Matter movement for reform in policing and criminal justice.

Reception
Syreeta McFadden for The Guardian noted that the video depicts archetypal southern black women "in ways that we haven't seen frequently represented in popular art or culture". Jon Caramanica of The New York Times described the video as "high-level, visuallystriking, Black Lives Matter-era allegory". In an interview for NPR, Dream Hampton described the video as a "visual anthem" that feels like "an Oscar-worthy feature". Hampton also praised how Beyoncé centers both black women and queer people in the video.

In 2021, Rolling Stone named "Formation" the greatest music video of all time. In 2019, Billboard named "Formation" the best music video of the 2010s, stating that it "served as an active reminder that black people could not be silenced". The video was included in E! News' "The Most Memorable Music Videos Ever" list, describing it as "a gorgeous paean to the Black experience in America, both a love letter and a rally cry." Slant Magazine named "Formation" the 30th greatest music video of all time.

Live performances

Beyoncé performed the song as part of a guest appearance during the Super Bowl 50 halftime show, which was headlined by Coldplay at the Levi's Stadium in Santa Clara, California on February 7, 2016. Her performance started after Bruno Mars finished with  "Uptown Funk". She wore a black and golden leather outfit and was joined towards the end by Mars again. The duo finished his track and went on performing dance choreographies. Jon Caramanica of The New York Times praised the singer's overall energetic performance, concluding that she outshined Coldplay. He felt that Beyoncé was the only artist capable of promoting new songs at the event. and "walking the cultural tightrope of delivering a song with such potent declarations of black pride on a stage that prefers studied neutrality". A writer of Rolling Stone felt that the performance, with tributes to Michael Jackson and the Black Panthers was "awe-inspiring".

"Formation" was the opening number on Beyoncé's The Formation World Tour (2016) with the first performance taking place in Miami at the Marlins Park on April 27, 2016. It was performed with the singer backed by dancers dressed in black sequined leotards and hats with wide brims. "Formation" was also performed as part of a medley of songs from Lemonade at the 2016 MTV Video Music Awards on August 28, 2016, along with "Pray You Catch Me", "Hold Up", "Sorry" and "Don't Hurt Yourself". She finished the performance with "Formation", with her dancers forming the female symbol at the end. Rolling Stones Rob Sheffield commented that Beyoncé "set the whole thing on fire with a 16-minute stomp through the Lemonade songbook", considering the performance as "one of the most blood-chillingly great live performances in award-show history". Billboard named the performance the greatest award show performance of all time. Beyoncé performed "Formation" during a surprise set at a "Get Out the Vote" concert for Hillary Clinton on November 4, 2016. Beyoncé and her dancers wore pantsuits, which is a piece of clothing that Clinton is known for.

During her 2018 Coachella performance, Beyoncé sang "Lift Every Voice and Sing" (commonly known as the Black National Anthem) and then transitioned into "Formation". Naima Cochrane of Billboard described the placement of the song as "thoughtful", tying "Formation" – "an anthemic call to action celebrating her power as a black woman"  – to the Civil Rights Movement anthem. The performance was subsequently included in the 2019 Homecoming film and live album. Beyoncé performed "Formation" during the On the Run II Tour, her 2018 co-headlining stadium world tour with Jay-Z. The song was also performed at the 2018 Global Citizen Festival: Mandela 100 charity concert in Johannesburg, South Africa, which commemorated Nelson Mandela's 100th birthday. Beyoncé and her dancers each wore a different color and lined up in a row, forming a human pride flag to show support for the LGBTQ community.

Controversy 
"Formation", its music video, and the performance at the Super Bowl received criticism from conservative figures, law enforcement organizations and social media users over perceived anti-police, anti-American and racist messages. Former Mayor of New York City Rudy Giuliani called the performance "outrageous", adding: "I don't know what the heck it was. A bunch of people bouncing around and all strange things. It was terrible." Congressman Peter King condemned the "Formation" video, saying that "no one should really care what she thinks about any serious issue confronting our nation". Canadian politician Jim Karygiannis said that the Canadian government should investigate Beyoncé and consider banning her from the country. Conservative commentator Rush Limbaugh said that the song was "representative of the cultural decay and social rot that is befalling our country". Conservative TV host Tomi Lahren directed a rant towards Beyoncé, accusing her of "ramrodding an aggressive agenda down our throats" and concluding: "Your husband was a drug dealer. For fourteen years, he sold crack cocaine. Talk about protecting black neighborhoods? Start at home". Beyoncé requested to use thirty seconds of Lahren's rant for the Formation World Tour, but Lahren denied the request. An anti-Beyoncé campaign was started on social media titled #BoycottBeyoncé, which was met with a competing #IStandWithBeyoncé hashtag. As part of the campaign, an anti-Beyoncé protest was held on February 16, 2016, outside the National Football League headquarters, citing the "hate speech & racism" in Beyoncé's performance, which encouraged a counter-protest to be organized. In order to stoke unrest as part of the Russian interference in the 2016 US elections, the Kremlin-backed Internet Research Agency placed adverts on Instagram urging people to attend the protests. Only three anti-Beyoncé protesters attended, while a larger counter-protest gathered, holding signs expressing statements such as "Pro-black doesn't mean anti-white".

The National Sheriffs' Association linked Beyoncé's performance to the killings of seven law enforcement officers in the US. Rutherford County Sheriff Robert Arnold blamed shots being fired outside his home on the "Formation" video. Police unions across the US encouraged a boycott of the Formation World Tour. Outside Beyoncé's concert at NRG Stadium on May 7, 2016, the Coalition of Police and Sheriffs held a demonstration over the Black Lives Matter themes in "Formation". The protesters wore "Police Lives Matter" T-shirts, held a printout of Jay Z's mugshot, and shone a blue light toward the stadium. President of the Tampa Police Benevolent Association Vinny Gericitano urged a boycott of Beyoncé's music and tour, however ensured that her concert in Tampa would be properly policed. Other law enforcement organizations did not join the boycott, such as those in Houston and Raleigh, the latter of which voted unanimously not to boycott the tour.

Other public figures defended Beyoncé. Writer Chimamanda Ngozi Adichie told Le Monde that she "very much admires" what Beyoncé did with "Formation". Adichie said that there is something in mainstream American culture "that says you cannot be too black", and questioned why people would feel uncomfortable with the song's message and not be outraged over police brutality. The controversy was discussed on Real Time with Bill Maher, where Maher mocked the right-wing response to "Formation". Rapper and activist Killer Mike explained how the song is not about white people, while comedian Margaret Cho added: "Black pride doesn't have to take anything away from white culture. I think this is what Black America needed. It's what all of us needed." Minister Louis Farrakhan backed the singer during a sermon and offered her the protection of the Nation of Islam. Singer-songwriter Ne-Yo questioned why Beyoncé was being criticized for singing about her identity, stating: "Everybody else has the right to talk about their culture and their race and be proud of it, so why can't we? Why can't she?" On The Daily Show, Jessica Williams defended Beyoncé and responded to commentators who said her performance was not "wholesome" enough, saying she did not realize singing about race was the equivalent to Janet Jackson's Super Bowl controversy.

Beyoncé responded to the backlash, telling Elle: "I'm an artist and I think the most powerful art is usually misunderstood." She expressed respect and admiration for police officers and explained that the message of "Formation" was not anti-police but against police brutality and injustice. Beyoncé added: "If celebrating my roots and culture during Black History Month made anyone uncomfortable, those feelings were there long before a video and long before me. I'm proud of what we created and I'm proud to be part of a conversation that is pushing things forward in a positive way." Beyoncé later sold "Boycott Beyoncé" merchandise at the Formation World Tour, acting as a tongue-in-cheek reference to the controversy. The Atlantic's Spencer Kornhaber wrote that this was also a statement that Beyoncé was unwavering in her beliefs, which directly acknowledges "the people she's alienated and telling them she doesn't want them to come back".

Impact and legacy

Race and politics 

Upon its release, "Formation" dominated public conversation and ignited discussions on the topics of culture, racism and politics. Many academic syllabi, think pieces, ideological debates and analyses were published that were triggered by the release of the song. Puja Patel, editor-in-chief of Pitchfork, wrote that the song was "an awakening for a country in crisis" at first, and it has since evolved to "live on as a reminder of the slow, persistent, daily work of organizing and the power of resilience and protest". The song garnered attention for the Black Lives Matter movement and raised awareness for issues facing black people before the 2016 US presidential election. Charles Hughes, professor and director of the Memphis Center at Rhodes College, said that music was one of the strongest influences on the 2016 presidential election and that "Formation" had the greatest influence of all songs. Hughes described the song as "invoking movement" and reminding listeners of the role of women in the Black Lives Matter movement. In Michael Moore in TrumpLand, American filmmaker Michael Moore said that Beyoncé's performance of "Formation" at the Super Bowl was the breaking point of the shifting gender balance in American society, at which straight white men realized they were losing their power to women. The song forced Americans to address topics in American history, such as the Black Power movement, the Black Panther Party and Malcolm X, which had largely been excluded from history books and public school syllabi. The song also reclaimed the images of both the Black Lives Matter movement and Black Panther Party, which some Americans had associated with terrorism instead of liberation. Describing the song as "revolutionary", Riché Richardson wrote that it "unsettled the prevailing national fantasies of a post-racial America" and challenged listeners to envisage a future nation that is more inclusive of race, sexuality, and gender.

"Formation" became known as a protest song upon its release and has since been used as an anthem for various socio-political movements. The song became a Black Lives Matter anthem, being adopted by activists and played at protests worldwide. Tamara Winfrey Harris explained how "music has a powerful ability to shape social values and beliefs", with "Formation" following in the footsteps of songs that provide "the support and soundtrack for civil rights", such as Billie Holiday's "Strange Fruit", Nina Simone's "Mississippi Goddam", Sam Cooke's "A Change Is Gonna Come" and Aretha Franklin's "Respect".  Nora Guthrie, daughter of American singer-songwriter Woody Guthrie, told Billboard that she looks to Beyoncé to continue the work of her father and other folk pioneers who wrote protest songs in the 1960s. Guthrie compared "Formation" to the work of Lead Belly, adding: "just because the music isn't based in acoustic guitar doesn't mean it isn't drawing from the same ideals." Gerrick D Kennedy of the Los Angeles Times wrote that the song became part of the "soundtrack for a new generation of young black men and women during a renewed time of racial unrest" and helped Beyoncé become "the face of protest music" in 2016. "Formation" continued to be one of the protest songs of the Black Lives Matter movement in 2020, with the track being played at the George Floyd protests. The song also became a women's empowerment anthem, with it being used to show support for the #MeToo movement and its lyrics being featured on signs at the Women's March.

Music industry 
With "Formation", Beyoncé "set the standard [for] nearly everyone else in the music industry", according to Bianca Gracie of Billboard. Glamour's Danielle Young wrote that the song "revolutionized the way we consume music", with Beyoncé making listeners stop and experience the song together. Writing for Vice, University of Waterloo professor Naila Keleta-Mae noted that with the release of the song, "Beyoncé went from manipulating the pop culture music industry machine to usurping it". Keleta-Mae added that the song has acted as a blueprint for how artists can "unequivocally delve into the politics that matter to them while simultaneously holding mainstream attention". Jordan Bassett of NME wrote that song has brought protest music back. In an article for The Guardian, Yale University professor Daphne A Brooks wrote that one can consider the song to have ushered in "a new golden age of protest music", as an "inspired, insurgent assault" that "challenges us to ask how we can all make cultural forms work for us and not the other way around".

Academic study 
"Formation" inspired the 2018 book Beyoncé in Formation: Remixing Black Feminism by Omise'eke Natasha Tinsley. The book is based on Tinsley's college course "Beyoncé Feminism, Rihanna Womanism", which she teaches as professor at Harvard University and the University of Texas at Austin, and analyses the cultural, political, and black feminist themes in Lemonade. In 2017, the University of Pennsylvania offered a course titled "Beyoncé, Protest, and Popular Music", which explored the risks that Beyoncé took when releasing "Formation", its place in the history of protest songs, and the role of gender and race in popular music. At the University of Hertfordshire, "Formation" was studied as part of the UK's first degree course focusing on the Black Lives Matter movement. In 2016, the University of Texas at San Antonio offered a class focusing on the "Formation" video and Lemonade album. These projects were used as a basis to examine the sociocultural issues affecting black women through the study of black feminist theory, film, music, and literature. Texas Christian University offered a course titled "Beyoncé and Intersectionality", which used "Formation" and other Beyoncé projects "to explore deeper issues of patriarchy, racism, classism and sexism in society". In 2021, Boston University offered a course that studied the "Formation" video as part of their exploration of how the South has been depicted in American fiction. The University of Wisconsin–Madison School of Nursing analyzed the concepts and issues in "Formation" to explore topics such as intersections of black history, black femininity and body politics, and how the Black Lives Matter movement has impacted health and health outcomes. The 2017-18 Rabinor Lecture in American Studies at Cornell University by Riché Richardson was inspired by "Formation", being titled "Writing Home: The Birth of Beyoncé and a Formation Nation". Richardson also taught a course titled "Beyoncé Nation", which studied "Formation" and other projects to examine Beyoncé's use of iconic symbolism, allusions to police brutality, and feminist themes.

Popular culture 

References within the lyrics of "Formation" have popularized certain brands and phrases. The mention of the American restaurant chain Red Lobster in the song's bridge increased sales at the restaurants by 33%, and upon the song's release, the chain was tweeted about over 42,000 times during the first hour and trended for the first time in its history according to Red Lobster spokesperson Erica Ettori. Employees also renamed popular menu items after Beyoncé and call the effect the "Beyoncé Bounce". The term "Bama" received a major boost in prominence after it was used in "Formation", and the word was subsequently added to the Oxford English Dictionary. Beyoncé's shoutout to the Chevrolet El Camino car in the song and its feature in the music video "did more in 5 seconds for the El Camino than General Motors marketing did for years", according to Hannah Elliott of Bloomberg.

The use of the word "slay" in the song has since popularized the term. A novel method of screening drugs to combat antibiotic resistance was named SLAY (Surface Localized Antimicrobial Display) as a reference to the song. Presbyterian pastor Floretta Barbee-Watkins evoked the song in the opening devotion of the 2021 Presbyterian Mission Agency Board meeting, where she called for the Presbyterian Church (USA) to "get in formation" by transforming the church in a time of volatility and complexity, and ended the devotion with the call to action "'cause we slay".

The lyric "I got hot sauce in my bag, swag" became a common refrain after the song's release and inspired people to produce related merchandise. In an interview with The Breakfast Club during her 2016 presidential campaign, Hillary Clinton referenced the lyric, saying she carries hot sauce in her purse. This sparked controversy, with some saying that she was pandering to young black voters.

One of the hairstyles that Beyoncé wore in the music video, with long cornrows with a deep side part, has since been termed "Lemonade braids" after the album and remains a popular hairstyle for black women. The black power beret was given "a new lease of life" after the performance of "Formation" at the Super Bowl, according to The Guardian's deputy fashion editor Priya Elan, triggering the hat's comeback as a symbol of black power. Piping became the defining trend of the spring/summer 2016 fashion season after Beyoncé wore a piped shirt in the "Formation" video.

Cover versions and usage in media
Several white musicians released acoustic covers of "Formation". Jonny Hetherington, frontman of Canadian rock band Art of Dying, posted a cover of the song on February 18, 2016. In contrast to the original track, Hetherington sings with a clear vocal accompanied by piano chords. This video, among the other covers, sparked controversy as they were perceived to be trivializing the specific blackness of the song. In The Oxford Handbook of Social Media and Music Learning, Joseph Michael Abramo wrote that it is "striking and uncomfortable" to see a white man sing lyrics such as "I like my negro nose with Jackson Five nostrils", which celebrate black features that have been "denigrated by white conceptions of beauty". Abramo added that Hetherington's delivery eliminates the "grittiness" of the track, in turn eliminating "the criticism of institutional racism it represents". In response to these covers, Black Twitter posted trap covers of songs by white artists, such as Taylor Swift's "You Belong With Me", The Beatles' "Hey Jude", and Queen's "We Will Rock You", to outrage from fans. This also ignited a wider debate on the appropriation of black culture in music.

American electronic musician Lotic released a remix of "Formation" titled "Formation (Election Anxiety/America Is Over Edit)" on November 9, 2016, in response to the results of the United States presidential election. The song evokes Lotic's trademark industrial sound as well as that of marching bands, acting as a reference to Beyoncé's Super Bowl performance of the song and as a tribute to the South. The song was named "Best New Track" by Pitchfork, with Philip Sherburne writing that it "turns Beyoncé's strutting call to arms into a cry of pain and defiance".

Australian brand Misha Collection concluded its Australian Fashion Week show on May 16, 2016, with models led by Bella Hadid walking to "Formation". This received criticism, as there were no models of color cast in the show, which acts in contrast to the song's message of celebrating blackness. This incident was used to trigger conversations on the lack of diversity in the fashion industry.

"Formation" was used in Google's 2021 Women's History Month commercial that celebrates women who became "firsts" in their respective fields.

Personnel
Credits adapted from Beyoncé's website.

Song credits

Writing – Michael L. Williams II, Beyoncé, Khalif Brown, Asheton Hogan
Production – Mike WiLL Made-It, Beyoncé
Vocal production – Beyoncé
Additional production – Pluss
Ad-libs – Swae Lee of Rae Sremmurd
Additional background ad-libs – Big Freedia
Trumpet – Matt Doe
Horn arrangement – Derek Dixie
Recording – Stuart White; The Beehive, Los Angeles
Audio mixing – Jaycen Joshua; Innersount MGMT, Larrabee Sound Studios, North Hollywood and Stuart White; Pacifique Studio, Los Angeles
Assistant mix engineering – Maddox Chhim, David Nakaji, Arthur Chambazyan
Mastering – Dave Kutch, The Mastering Palace, New York City

Charts

Weekly charts

Year-end charts

Certifications

Release history

See also
List of number-one urban singles of 2016 (Australia)

References

External links
 

2016 songs
2016 singles
Beyoncé songs
Music videos directed by Melina Matsoukas
Music video controversies
Sampling controversies
Songs written by Beyoncé
Song recordings produced by Beyoncé
Song recordings produced by Mike Will Made It
Songs written by Swae Lee
MTV Video of the Year Award
MTV Video Music Award for Best Direction
Grammy Award for Best Short Form Music Video
LGBT-related songs
Songs against racism and xenophobia
Black Lives Matter art
Songs written by Asheton Hogan
Songs written by Mike Will Made It
Columbia Records singles
Protest songs